Jamalon was an online book retailer based in Amman that ships to readers throughout the Middle East. It was founded in October 2010 by entrepreneur Ala' Alsallal with the support of Fadi Ghandour.  

As of August 2017, it delivers over 12 million publications in Arabic and English. In 2016, 80 percent of the company's sales consisted of Arabic titles. It maintains partnerships with over 3,000 Arabic and 27,000 English-language publishers. It is the largest online bookseller in the Middle East.

In May 2022, the company's website became unavailable and instead displayed a message title "Jamalon's experience in the publishing sector in the Arab world", which declared that the company has ceased its operations, cites issues with investment companies demand of profit as of 2019.

References

External links 
 Official website

Book selling websites
Companies based in Amman
Retail companies established in 2010
Jordanian companies established in 2010